The Tailor and Ansty is a 1942 book by Eric Cross about the life of the Irish tailor and storyteller, Timothy Buckley, and his wife Anastasia ("Ansty") Buckley (née McCarthy). The book was banned by the Censorship of Publications Board because of its depiction of premarital cohabitation, and its sexual frankness.

The Tailor and Ansty was the subject of significant debate in 1942 in Seanad Éireann, Ireland's upper house, in which Buckley was accused of being "sex-obsessed", and his wife of being a "moron". It was said that they were examples of the "sores of moral leprosy" that could "undermine Christianity". Parts of the Seanad debate were struck from the record because they contained quotes from the book made by Sir John Keane, to determine if they were really obscene or not. Keane also made the point that an opponent, Professor Magennis, did not know what sodomy was. The wider debate concerned the activities of the then "Free State Board of Book Censors", and Keane's motion was defeated on a vote by 34–2.

The local clergy arrived at Buckley's home, and forced him to burn his copy of the book. Frank O'Connor, who had become an authority on the issue, said that a boycott had been arranged against the couple.

The book was adapted for the stage in 1968 by P. J. O'Connor, with Eamonn Kelly and Brid Lynch playing the Tailor and his wife.

In 2004 Ronan Wilmot and Nuala Hayes revived the play with Ronan Wilmot playing the Tailor and Nuala Hayes playing Ansty respectively.
In 2004 Cónal Creedon wrote a radio adaptation, which was broadcast by Raidió Teilifís Éireann (RTÉ), with a cast of readers headed by Niall Toibin

The ban on the book remained in place until the 1960s.

References

1942 books
Irish books
Censored books